This is a list of English Schools' Football Association competitions in 2004-2005:

English Schools' Football Association
Schools